Ayanivelikulangara is a village in Kollam district in the state of Kerala, India. Noted Malayalam Media person Mr. Leen B. Jesmas hails from this place.

Demographics- Census 2011

References 
http://www.census2011.co.in/data/town/628369-ayanivelikulangara-kerala.html

References

Villages in Kollam district